Wa are traditional sailing outrigger canoes of the Caroline Islands, Palau, and Yap. They have a single outrigger. They are similar to the sakman of the Northern Marianas.

Design and construction

Wa are proa — vessels with identical bow and stern, allowing the craft to reverse without turning.
They are made from hewn-out hulls, typically breadfruit trunks, with single wide top-strakes, and carved head and stern pieces. Sails are lateen rigged and were traditionally made of pandanus mat sailcloth. Benjamin Morrell recorded in the 1830s that sails were "made in small pieces of about three feet square, sewed together. In cutting the sail to its proper shape, the pieces which come off one side answer to go on the other; this gives it the proper form, and causes the halliards to be bent on in the middle of the yard." After World War II sails switched to canvas, and after 1973 the use of dacron began to increase.

Early accounts agreed upon "a lee-platform on the side opposite to the outrigger-frame, which also has a large platform of poles laid athwart its booms, whereon men are stationed to counterbalance any excessive heeling over toward the lee side when the wind increases in force". The windward float stabilizes the craft. This occurs "by its weight rather than its buoyancy. When the float becomes submerged in a wave its increased drag swings the canoe slightly around into the wind, thereby relieving some of the wind pressure on the sail. The canoe slows down temporarily and allows the float to rise again." This design feature also acts to reduce drift by tending to place the wind toward the beam or side of the craft.

On Poluwat, the skill of canoe building is called héllap ("great rigging"), and different schools of canoe carpentry include  hálinruk ("Rope of Truk") and hálinpátu ("Rope of the four Western Islands").

Speed and means of propulsion
Wa may be sailed over long distances, paddled, or moved by punting. One analysis of wa under sail indicated "conclusively that these primitive craft are superior to a modern boat on significant points of sailing." They were estimated by Anson in 1776 to be able to move at or perhaps beyond wind speed, and to have better windward pointing ability than any craft previously encountered. Edwin Doran, author of Wangka: Austronesian Canoe Origins (1981), cited a  average for a wa traveling from Guam to Manila.

Use and range

Trade items included shells, tapa cloth, wooden vessels, cordage, iron, copper, nails and knives. Rai stones were brought from Palau to Yap. Physical evidence of contact with the Chamorro people of Guam in the far southern Mariana Islands includes pestles, fish hooks, and shell rings from the Caroline Islands." The earliest documentary evidence is Friar Juan Cantova's 1721 letter to Friar William D'Aubenton in which he describes the June 19, 1721 landing of canoes from Woleai on Guam. During the same Spanish colonial period, many Chamorro people died due to introduced disease or were forcibly relocated from Saipan to Guam, and Caroline Islanders emigrated to Saipan in their place. By 1788 fleets from the Caroline Islands were sailing to Guam near annually to trade in iron and other goods. In the same year, a canoe from Woleai arrived at Guam and told the Spanish that "they had always been trading with Guam and had only discontinued their voyaging after witnessing the cruelty of the Europeans."

Long voyages of at least  between the Carolines, Philippines and Marianas were frequent. A canoe from Satawal made a  voyage to Saipan in 1970. Star courses between islands were known on Puluwat for all major islands from Tobi, south-west of Palau, to Makin in the Gilbert Islands – clear evidence of repeated trips over various parts of this -long region. According to the 1911 Encyclopædia Britannica Eleventh Edition, the Caroline Islands natives "who are Micronesian hybrids of finer physique than their kinsmen of the Pelew Islands, have a comparatively high mental standard, being careful agriculturists, and peculiarly clever boatbuilders and navigators."

There are a larger number of stars grouped around the east–west axis of this navigation system – since the Caroline Islands are an east–west island chain, most voyages occur in those directions, and for seven to eight months of the year the dominant winds are north easterly. These dominant winds are referred to as etiu-mai-rakena-efang (or "a wind coming from north of east").

According to the contentious historian Andrew Sharp, earlier observers Otto von Kotzebue and Louis de Freycinet's information suggests that long distance voyaging was seasonally limited, that "the seasonal south-west monsoon was feared by the Caroline voyagers", that normal steady trade winds from the north-east were preferred, and that the boats – once turtled – were troublesome to right.

The Metropolitan Museum of Art in New York holds an artifact – called a "hos" that has a stylized human figure attached to Stingray spines (the purported sources of its power) – they describe as being used in "weather magic, believed to have the ability to prevent or alter the path of approaching storms", which is tentatively ascribed to Yap.

Decline

After the German–Spanish Treaty of 1899, inter-island voyaging was discouraged by the German New Guinea and Japanese colonial governments and by the commercial availability of trade goods. This discouragement was, however, not very effective.

A 1966 Peace Corps volunteer reported a fleet of 20 canoes of various sizes, that sailed from five islands within the Woleai atoll to greet an arriving ship, and stated there was only one motorboat at the time. By 1973, only a handful of the canoes were still actively sailed on Woleai, and there were more than 20 motorboats. In 1973 voyaging traditions were reportedly most alive on Satawal, Namonabetiu, and to a lessert extent Nanonuito and Ifalik.

"Long-distance noninstrument voyaging" was still practiced in the area in the late 1980s.

In 2012, the charity Habele and community-based organization Waa'gey were supporting younger outer-islanders from Lamotrek to gain experience in wa building.

Surviving models
A scale model Poluwat wa collected by David Lewis and Barry Lewis, father and son, in 1969 is held by the Australian National Maritime Museum at Darling Harbour, Sydney, Australia. A further, damaged, small scale model is also in Sydney at the Powerhouse Museum.

Two additional models of wa craft from Yap, made before 1909, are held at the Ethnological Museum of Berlin in Germany.

See also

Austronesia
catamaran
David Henry Lewis
Fanuankuwel
Hipour
Kafeŕoor
Marshall Islands stick chart
Mau Piailug
outrigger canoe
Polynesian navigation
proa
Weriyeng

References

Notes

Citations

Sources

External links
Wa models made before 1909:
Model #1
Model #2, view #1
Model #2, view #2
Wa in Palau, 1936:
Wa under construction
Wa under sail
Wa model from Palau in Bishop Museum, Honolulu, Hawaii:
View #1
Satawal islander building a canoe
Canoe bailer from Palau (record of previous sale, including image, at an auction site)
American Museum of Natural History Digital Special Collections:
Caroline Islands:
People in outrigger canoe on water, Ulithi, Caroline Islands
Canoe house in village, Ngulu, Caroline Islands
Palau:
Sailboat used for fishing, Kayangel, Palau
Men in boat against background of heavy vegetation, Koror, Palau Islands. Clark, Eugenie AMNH Digital Special Collections, accessed January 12, 2015
Men sailing Japanese outrigger canoe, Palau - visible sail repairs
Outrigger canoe used by Japanese fisherman on Angaur, Palau

Canoes
Exploration ships
Sailboat types
Indigenous boats
Outrigger canoes